Baleh Dasti (also Romanized as Baleh Dastī; also known as Balādasī, Baladastī, and Bālā Dastī) is a village in Yeylan-e Shomali Rural District, in the Central District of Dehgolan County, Kurdistan Province, Iran. At the 2006 census, its population was 1,162, in 286 families. The village is populated by Kurds.

References 

Towns and villages in Dehgolan County
Kurdish settlements in Kurdistan Province